Robert Samuel Jackson Binning (28 November 1935 – 8 August 2005) was a New Zealand fencer.

He won the bronze medal as part of the men's sabre team at the 1962 British Empire and Commonwealth Games. His teammates in the event were Michael Henderson and Brian Pickworth.

Binning competed individually in the sabre and épée at the 1958, 1962 and 1966 British Empire and Commonwealth Games. He won eight national titles in the men's sabre and one in the épée over his career.

Binning died in Queensland, Australia, on 8 August 2005.

References

1935 births
2005 deaths
New Zealand male épée fencers
Fencers at the 1958 British Empire and Commonwealth Games
Fencers at the 1962 British Empire and Commonwealth Games
Fencers at the 1966 British Empire and Commonwealth Games
Commonwealth Games bronze medallists for New Zealand
Commonwealth Games medallists in fencing
New Zealand male sabre fencers
20th-century New Zealand people
21st-century New Zealand people
Medallists at the 1962 British Empire and Commonwealth Games